"Moonlight in Vermont" is a popular song about the U.S. state of Vermont, written by John Blackburn (lyrics) and Karl Suessdorf (music) and published in 1944. It was introduced by Margaret Whiting in a 1944 recording.

Background
The lyrics are unusual in that they do not rhyme. John Blackburn, the lyricist, has been quoted as saying, "After completing the first 12 bars of the lyric, I realized there was no rhyme and then said to Karl, 'Let’s follow the pattern of no rhyme throughout the song. It seemed right.'" The lyrics are also unconventional in that each verse (not counting the bridge) is a haiku.

The song is considered an unofficial state song of Vermont and is frequently played as the first dance song at Vermont wedding receptions.

Recorded versions

"Moonlight in Vermont" has been covered by numerous other artists over the years:
Johnny Smith recorded a version of the song in 1952 with Stan Getz, later the title track on a 1956 album
The Gerry Mulligan Quartet recorded a version in 1953 with Chet Baker
Ella Fitzgerald and Louis Armstrong released a version on their 1956 album, Ella and Louis
Jo Stafford covered the song on her 1956 album Ski Trails
Billie Holiday covered the song in 1957
Frank Sinatra covered the song for his 1958 studio album Come Fly With Me, and performed it regularly live. It appears on his live albums Sinatra Saga, Sinatra & Sextet: Live in Paris, Frank Sinatra with the Red Norvo Quintet: Live in Australia, 1959, Sinatra: Vegas and Live at the Meadowlands. Additionally, it appears as a duet with Linda Ronstadt on his 1994 album Duets II.
Sam Cooke covered the song on his self titled 1958 debut album
Sarah Vaughan covered the song in 1958 on No Count Sarah
Dorothy Ashby covered the song in 1958 on Hip Harp with Frank Wess
Ray Charles included it on his 1960 album The Genius Hits the Road
Brook Benton covered the song on his 1960 album Songs I Love to Sing
Bobby Womack covered the song on his 1969 album Fly Me to the Moon
Willie Nelson covered the song for his 1978 album Stardust
Jane Monheit covered the song for her 2005 Christmas album The Season
Seth MacFarlane covered the song for his 2014 Christmas album Holiday For Swing
Captain Beefheart's song "Moonlight on Vermont", on his 1969 album Trout Mask Replica, is unrelated

References

External links
 Analysis of "Moonlight in Vermont" at Jazz Standards

1943 songs
1940s jazz standards
Songs written by John Blackburn (songwriter)
Songs written by Karl Suessdorf
Margaret Whiting songs
Ella Fitzgerald songs
Louis Armstrong songs
Frank Sinatra songs
Willie Nelson songs
Ray Charles songs
Rosemary Clooney songs
The Coasters songs
Nat King Cole songs
Sam Cooke songs
Billie Holiday songs
Frankie Laine songs
Johnny Mathis songs
Linda Ronstadt songs
Neil Sedaka songs
Sarah Vaughan songs
Vermont culture
Haiku
Pop standards
Songs about Vermont